The Road Transport Act 1987, is a Malaysian law which enacted to make provision for the regulation of motor vehicles and of traffic on roads and other matters with respect to roads and vehicles thereon; to make provision for the protection of third parties against risks arising out of the use of motor vehicles; to make provision for the co-ordination and control of means of and facilities for transport; to make provision for the co-ordination and control of means of and facilities for construction and adaptation of motor vehicles; and to make provision for connected purposes.

Structure
The Road Transport Act 1987, in its current form (1 February 2013), consists of 5 Parts containing 129 sections and 3 schedules (including 10 amendments).
 Part I: Preliminary
 Part II: Classification, Registration and Licensing Motor Vehicles and Drivers
 Classification of Motor Vehicles
 Registration of Motor Vehicles
 Licensing of Motor Vehicles
 Miscellaneous
 Licensing of Motor Drivers
 Driving and Offences in Connection Therewith
 Licensing of Drivers and Conductors of Public Service Vehicles, Employees Vehicles and Goods Vehicles
 Miscellaneous
 Part IIA: Periodic Inspection of Motor Vehicles
 Part IIB: Foreign Motor Vehicles
 Part III: Roads
 Part IV: Provisions against Third Party Risks Arising out of the Use of Motor Vehicles
 Part V: Offences and Miscellaneous Provisions
 Schedules

References

External links
 Road Transport Act 1987 

1987 in Malaysian law
Malaysian federal legislation
History of transport in Malaysia
Transport legislation
1987 in transport